Reidar Waaler (February 12, 1894 – February 5, 1979) was a soldier in the United States Army who received the Medal of Honor for his actions during World War I.

Biography
Waaler was born in Norway on February 12, 1894, and died February 5, 1979. He is buried in Forest Hills Memorial Park and Mausoleum Palm City, Florida. His grave can be found in the NEAGS section, row A, lot 5.

Medal of Honor Citation
Rank and organization: Sergeant, U.S. Army, Company A, 105th Machine Gun Battalion, 27th Division. Place and date: At Ronssoy, France; September 27, 1918. Entered service at: New York, New York. Birth: February 12, 1894; Oslo, Norway. General Orders: War Department, General Orders No. 5 (1920).

Citation:

In the face of heavy artillery and machinegun fire, he crawled forward to a burning British tank, in which some of the crew were imprisoned, and succeeded in rescuing two men. Although the tank was then burning fiercely and contained ammunition which was likely to explode at any time, this soldier immediately returned to the tank and, entering it, made a search for the other occupants, remaining until he satisfied himself that there were no more living men in the tank.

Military Awards 
Waaler's military decorations and awards include:

See also

List of Medal of Honor recipients
List of Medal of Honor recipients for World War I

References

External links

Norwegian-born Medal of Honor recipients
United States Army Medal of Honor recipients
United States Army soldiers
United States Army personnel of World War I
Military personnel from New York City
1894 births
1979 deaths
World War I recipients of the Medal of Honor
Norwegian emigrants to the United States
Recipients of the Distinguished Conduct Medal
Burials in Florida